Noel Murphy (born 1931) was an Irish hurler who played for Tipperary Senior Championship club Thurles Sarsfields. He played for the Tipperary senior hurling team for a number of seasons, during which time he usually lined out as a wing-back.

Honours

Tipperary
All-Ireland Senior Hurling Championship (2): 1958, 1962
Munster Senior Hurling Championship (3): 1958, 1960, 1962

References

1936 births
1997 deaths
Thurles Sarsfields hurlers
Tipperary inter-county hurlers